Ronald Leighty (August 27, 1930 – November 11, 2022) was an American politician. He served as a Democratic member of the South Dakota House of Representatives.

Life and career 
Leighty was born in Aberdeen, South Dakota. He attended Northern State University and served in the United States Air Force.

In 1963, Leighty was elected to the South Dakota House of Representatives, serving until 1966.

Leighty died in November 2022, at the age of 92.

References 

1930 births
2022 deaths
Politicians from Aberdeen, South Dakota
Democratic Party members of the South Dakota House of Representatives
20th-century American politicians
Northern State University alumni